The stomach is an organ found in animals.

Stomach may also refer to:

Abdomen, in colloquial use
Stomach (Chinese constellation)
Stomach (Chinese medicine)
The Stomach, a 2014 British short horror film by Ben Steiner